The 1926 24 Hours of Le Mans was the 4th Grand Prix of Endurance, and took place on 12 and 13 June 1926.

This year saw the entry of the Peugeot works team, after strong success elsewhere in touring and grand prix racing. Their competition would come from defending distance victors Lorraine-Dietrich and Bentley. Chenard-Walcker was a notable absentee, after being the pacesetter in the early years. The start/finish line and pits returned to its original point and extensive building of grandstands and spectator facilities was undertaken.

From the start the Peugeots set the pace chased by the Bentleys and Lorraines. As the others encountered mechanical issues, the experienced Lorraine drivers built a strong 1–2 lead that was never headed. A late charge by Bentley ended in the last hour when Sammy Davis could not stop in time and put the car into the sandbank at the end of the Mulsanne Straight.

First on distance was Robert Bloch and André Rossignol (repeating his 1925 triumph). Lorraine-Dietrich was just beaten to the Biennial Cup prize by the Italian Officine Meccaniche team, who won on a countback.

Regulations
The process for deciding the winners had been problematic. The Triennial Cup was only run the once and the calculation for the Biennial Cup was still difficult. Therefore, the Automobile Club de l'Ouest (ACO) came up with a new competition. The Index of Performance instead used the ratio of exceeding a car's designated target distance instead of the absolute number of laps. For the track position on the final lap after exactly 24 hours, the distance would be calculated using the average speed of the car in the time after reaching its target. With engine improvements, the targets distances were again modified:

The competition was boosted by a substantial prize of FF10000 from Grand Garage Saint-Didier, the large Parisian car-dealership that had entered the Chrysler car in the previous year's race.

Manufacturers now only needed to have produced 10 of a model to be eligible to race them. Cars needed to be running at the end of the 24 hours, and complete their final lap in a minimum of 30 minutes. The ACO dictated the pit sequence, where pit-crew could assist the drivers – doing refuelling, adding oil, water, and then changing tyres and wheels before getting onto other mechanical work. The tools used had to have been carried on the car. Smoking was also now prohibited in the pits and fire extinguishers had to be carried on each car.

Further, to assist with safety, marshals were stationed around the track with blue and yellow flags. A held blue flag warned the driver to hold his current path, and when waved, to slow down. The yellow flag told the drivers to stop immediately. At night lights were fitted with blue or yellow filters.

The Track
The day after the 1925 race, the landowners on Les Raineries side of the track approached the ACO with a more reasonable offer to sell the land. Once the deal was done, with the assistance of the local civic authorities, the organisation began a comprehensive building program. Permanent wooden pits and a 3000-seat grandstand were erected, as well as a well and toilet block. The race-control tower was rebuilt and the pits equipped with telephones, electricity and running water. Several cafés were set up, complete with electric table lamps and white-suited waitering staff, for the spectators’ refreshment. The car parks were extended to accommodate 3000 vehicles and road access improved, and footbridges built by the pits, Pontlieue hairpin and near Maison Blanche.

The main road south, the Ligne Droit or Mulsanne Straight was tar-sealed. The Pontlieue hairpin and the stretch from Arnage to the pits were treated with lime to harden the surface.

Entries
Although 60 cars had originally been entered, only 44 actually arrived for scrutineering. There were 16 spots reserved for the qualifiers of the 1925-6 Biennial Cup, but again not all were taken up with Chenard-Walcker, Sunbeam and Diatto not present.

Note: The first number is the number of arrivals, the second the number who started.

The previous year's winners, La Lorraine-Dietrich arrived with a strong team of three cars. This year's version of the B3-6 Sport had a strengthened chassis with a torpédo bodystyle. With weight-savings, the engine could push the car to 150 kp/h (95 mph) with its 3-speed gearbox. The driver crew was largely unchanged. The 1925 winners were split:André Rossignol with Robert Bloch and Gérard de Courcelles with Marcel Mongin. The third car was again driven by Brisson and Stalter.

France's biggest car-manufacturer, Peugeot, arrived at Le Mans for the first time this year. Pre-war it made up nearly half of French production and brought the greatest racing successes. The 174 Sport had carried on that trend in the 1920s. The big 3.8-litre sleeve-valve engine put out over 110 bhp. Two cars were entered for their experienced works drivers André Boillot and Louis Rigal in one and veteran Louis Wagner and Christian Dauvergne in the other.

Bentley came to Le Mans with renewed hope of a better showing. In financial difficulties, the company had been recently bailed out by Woolf Barnato, heir to a South African mining fortune. With £100000 (equivalent to well over £5million in 2015) his investment company, Baromans, bought up a controlling share of Bentley and Barnato became the chairman. The company had been trying to break 24-hour records without success. Two works 3-litre Speed models were entered. Driven by Frank Clement/George Duller and doctor Dudley Benjafield with journalist Sammy Davis, they became the kernel of the “Bentley Boys” works team. A third car, a new short-wheelbase 3-litre Super Sport, was privately entered by wealthy, 21-year old gentleman-driver Arthur “Tommy” Thistlethwayte.
Bentley mechanic Les Pennel came up with a new way to carry the 180 kg compulsory “passenger ballast”. Rather than using sandbags, which rolled around and dried out over time, he installed steel tubes filled with lead of an equivalent weight. Bolted to the front and rear of the car they gave better weight distribution and handling.

Ariès again bought four cars to Le Mans. The new surbaissée version of the 3-litre GP2 model had a distinctive, streamlined “tank” body-styling. Team principal Baron Charles Petiet this year was able to get Jean Chassagne as a driver to replace Louis Wagner who had gone to Peugeot. A pre-war French racing hero and veteran of three Indy 500s he was paired with his former riding mechanic, now team-driver, Robert Laly. The other 3-litre was a “boat-tail” GP3 variant for Arthur Duray/Charles Flohot. As before, they also entered a pair of “Super” versions of the 1.1-litre CC2 car.

Charles Montier and his Ford-based specials, runners in the first three Le Mans, did not return. However, another American company arrived at Le Mans this year. John Willys had bought Overland Automobile in 1907, renaming it Willys-Automotive in 1912 and by 1915 was the second-biggest American car-manufacturer behind Ford. It built cars under both the Overland and Willys-Knight names. It was their French agent, Henri Falconnet, who entered three cars in the race. The biggest-engined car in the field was the Willys-Knight 66 Great Six: the 3.9-litre sleeve-valve engine put out 65 bhp that got it up to 110 kp/h (70 mph) and had Paul Gros (ex-Bignan) and Paul Leduc (ex-Talbot) as its drivers. The new Overlands had 2.8-litre sleeve-valve engines generating 40 bhp and both a hard-top and coupé version arrived.

The Italian Officine Meccaniche (OM) team was back after a very positive debut the previous year. The Tipo 665S had been substantially upgraded, with a much lighter and lower chassis. This year the Grand Prix drivers “Nando” Minoia and Giulio Foresti were paired together, with the Danieli brothers and Renato Balestrero/Frédéric Thelusson in the others.

Théophile Schneider was a pre-war auto-manufacturer that was getting back into motor-racing. The 25 SP was a development of its 1922 model, with success commercially and in racing. Its 2-litre engine was race-tuned to get it up to 140 kp/h (85 mph). Majority shareholder Robert Poirier drove one car for the race with Antonin Fontaine with another run by Auguste Lefranc/Pierre Tobourin. The other new team was from Jousset – a coach-building company, from near Limoges in provincial France, that had just started building cars in 1924. Two variants of its M1 design were entered: one was a hardtop saloon, and the other a convertible tourer with boat-tail chassis. The 1.5-litre CIME engine put out 50 bhp giving it a top speed of 140 kp/h (90 mph).

Henri Précloux returned to Le Mans this year with three cars. Two were of his smaller 1.2-litre DS models of standard saloons with CIME engines. The other was a special streamlined version of the larger 1.5-litre DT model. Entered for the Biennial Cup, it had a similar “tank”’ bodywork to the Ariès. Salmson had re-established its works racing team in 1925, and returned to Le Mans with three cars. Two were the successful “Grand Sport” development of the VAL-3 two-seater. Its 1.1-litre double-overhead cam engine developed 27 bhp pushing the car up to 120 kp/h (75 mph). They also brought along a larger 4-seater, the 1.2-litre D2 tourer.

Other race regulars Corre La Licorne presented three different cars this year. One was its regular V16 model with the 1425cc SCAP engine. Another was a new model – the G6 – with a new 6-cylinder 1.5-litre engine of their own design. It was fitted in a low-profile bonnetline with an underslung, surbaissée chassis. The third car had the new engine fitted into a standard V16.

Practice
The roads were closed for race practice over the Friday night from 10pm till 6am on Saturday. The Henneguet/Aladame hardtop Overland had an accident and fire during practice and could not be repaired in time to take the start.

Race

Start

After two years of blazing sunshine the weather over race-week was terrible, with heavy rain every day. However, by Saturday it was overcast and clearing with only occasional showers encouraging a record crowd to attend. First car away was the Jousset saloon – as it had no hood to put up! But in front at the first time around was Boillot's Peugeot, with a handy 300 metre lead over the works Bentleys (Clement and Davis), themselves well ahead of the privateer Bentley, Bloch's Lorraine-Dietrich and Wagner in the other Peugeot.  Bloch soon passed the Bentleys and closed in on Boillot though he did not have enough power to overtake him. The two big Ariès had been last away from the start, the drivers being meticulous assembling their hoods. However, after an hour they had caught up with the leading group with Laly getting up to sixth and Flohot ninth. Georges Irat had missed the 1925 race but returned with two cars this year. The first retirements, both were out early. For the team, four cars in two races had achieved only 55 laps put together.

After several hours, and 20 laps, the first pit-stops were due and first to stop was the Jousset hard-top – the new team finding their cars disturbingly heavy on fuel-consumption. After the driver-changes, it was the Bentleys which took the fight to the Boillot/Rigal Peugeot. George Duller set a new lap record and passed Rigal on the 26th lap. But he then overshot the Arnage corner and lost 20 minutes and two laps digging himself out of the sandbank. In the laborious work of digging himself out Duller had taken off his helmet and for several laps the car was in danger of being disqualified as drivers were not allowed to race without crash-helmets. Fearing he had dropped it roadside, it was only when he was finally convinced to pit that it was found in the seat next to him.
The Bentley's speed also spurred on the Lorraine-Dietrich team, as Bloch overtook Rigal in the twilight to take the lead. Accelerating out of Pontlieue hairpin, a blowback set Duray's engine on fire. With good presence of mind, he quickly parked and put the fire extinguisher onto it. The Ariès was out of the race, but the car was saved.

Night
Going into the night, the Corre La Licorne of Waldemar Lestienne arrived in the pits with its left mudguard bent over the bonnet, the wheel knocked out of alignment and its rearbumper trailing along the ground. The driver was claiming he had been squeezed off the road into a ditch by another car. Then soon after, as de Courcelles was closing onto the tail of Dauvergne in the second Peugeot, they came up behind  the EHP “tank” to lap it. The 1.5-litre EHP would not make way and both the Peugeot and Lorraine spun off the road avoiding it. Dauvergne lost time getting his Peugeot out of the ditch and both teams lodged protests with the officials about the unsporting driving, but the EHP's engine expired soon after anyway.

At midnight the Lorraine had done 48 laps (four more than at the same time the previous year) and held a one-lap lead over the two Peugeots, the next Lorraine and the remaining Ariès between the two Bentleys. At 1am the Ariès tank pitted for a driver-change and refuelling. But Chassagne could not get the car restarted. He found the generator had not been recharging and the battery was flat. As only an electrical starter was allowed to be used, and no pushing or hand-cranking, it had to be retired.

So, by the halfway point at 4am, the Bloch and Rossignol still had a one-lap lead (73 laps) over their teammate and the Boillot/Rigal Peugeot (72). The other Peugeot and Thistlethwayte's Bentley were two laps further back with the third Lorraine (69) in sixth. Next were the two works Bentleys (68) with the two Italian OMs leading the 2-litre class rounding out the top-10 (66 & 65 laps). But from there, it only got worse for Peugeot. At 9pm, the Boillot/Rigal car had been delayed when a windscreen stay had broken, then the glass fell out. When the officials required it to be repaired but there was no spare, the car was disqualified. In the early hours the other car's battery went flat and when Wagner reversed up the pit to try and bump-start it, he was also disqualified – much to the disapproval of the spectators.

After his delay in the sandbank, Duller had been pushing hard through the night to catch up again. But the Bentley's charge came to an end with a broken valve as dawn approached.

Morning
By 8am there were only 23 cars left running. The Rossignol/Bloch Lorraine now had a two-lap lead over his teammate, itself holding a three-lap lead over the two Bentleys and the other Lorraine. The two OMs were next, still leading the 2-litre class from Clause's Bignan in eighth. The Dumont/Duprez Overland was ninth with the Tabourin/Lefranc Schneider completing the top-ten. An hour later, Gallop brought the privateer Bentley into the pits running on three cylinders to retire because of a broken rocker-arm forcing its retirement. Dudley Benjafield then really picked up the pace of the remaining Bentley, closing in on the Lorraines ahead by as much as twenty seconds a lap. Sammy Davis carried on the furious pursuit into the afternoon. Realising the danger, both Mongin and then de Courcelles lifted the second-placed car's pace too, breaking the lap record by seven seconds.

Finish and post-race
With half an hour to go Davis caught and passed Mongin on the Mulsanne straight. But the hard chase had worn down the Bentley's brakes and he arrived at the sharp Mulsanne corner too fast and pitched the Bentley into the sandbank. Sportingly, Mongin stopped to check Davis was okay but was not allowed to lend assistance. Unable to be extricated in time, the car could not be classified. Also, in the last hour Renato Balestrero in the third OM, was called in by the officials. He had to explain why he had stopped on the Mulsanne Straight after midday to pick up some tools which was not permitted conveniently left by an OM mechanic. Not surprisingly, disqualification was the result.

Brisson and Stalter inherited third place and the Lorraine-Dietrich team finished with an emphatic 1-2-3 finish, giving André Rossignol back-to-back victories on distance. The two OMs were fourth and fifth on the road, and also won the lucrative 1925-6 Biennial Cup by the slimmest of margins. It left the Lorraine-Dietrich team furious with the officials. This was because the Index of Performance was now counted as a ratio rather than absolute laps. Mongin's pace versus the Bentley meant he had to pit for a fuel top-up in the last hour, so his average speed on his excess laps was compromised. Unfortunately, their leading car was the one not entered into the Biennial Cup. It did set a distance record however - the equivalent of crossing the Atlantic Ocean in 24 hours, from Ireland to Newfoundland.

The American Overland had moved up to sixth into the last hour when it pulled into the pits to retire, only two laps short of its target. The two SARA cars both finished, in 11th and 12th, both easily exceeding their target distances. The leading one, of regular team drivers Marandet and Lécureul was the only 1100cc finisher in the 1925-36 Biennial Cup. Even though it was not classified, the lead Bentley had still met its minimum distance to qualify for the next Biennial Cup. Both Duller and Mongin were fined FF200 for racing at some time without a helmet on during the race.

The race was set as an endurance trial to improve the technology and reliability of touring cars. However, it also extended to motoring in general: the road resurfacing had greatly improved overall race-speed (the three Lorraines all exceeded an average speed of 100 km/h over the 24 hours). Tyre technology was also improving with virtually all the cars staying on their same original set of tyres. Only three tyres had to be replaced in the whole race.

It proved to be a bad year for the saturated French touring-car market with a number of smaller manufacturers struggling and forced to close. These included Ravel, Bignan and Jousset For other teams this was their last Le Mans as they chose to consolidate, including Georges Irat, Corre La Licorne, Rolland-Pilain and Overland, as well as the victors Lorraine-Dietrich and Officine Meccaniche.

Official results

Finishers
Results taken from Quentin Spurring's book, officially licensed by the ACO Although there were no official engine classes, the highest finishers in unofficial categories aligned with the Index targets are in Bold text.

Did Not Finish
 
Note *: [B]= car also entered in the 1925-6 Biennial Cup.
Note **: Not Classified because did not meet target distance.
Note ***: There were no official class divisions for this race. These are unofficial categories (used in subsequent years) related to the Index targets.

Did Not Start

1925-26 Coupe Biennale Rudge-Whitworth

Highest Finisher in Class

Note *: setting a new class distance record.
 There were no official class divisions for this race and these are the highest finishers in unofficial categories (used in subsequent years) related to the Index targets.

Statistics
Taken from Quentin Spurring's book, officially licensed by the ACO
 Fastest Lap – G. de Courcelles, #6 Lorraine-Dietrich B3-6 Le Mans – 9:03secs; 
 Longest Distance – 
 Average Speed on Longest Distance – 

Citations

References
 Clarke, R.M. - editor (1998)    Le Mans 'The Bentley & Alfa Years 1923-1939'    Cobham, Surrey: Brooklands Books  
 Clausager, Anders (1982)    Le Mans    London: Arthur Barker Ltd  
 Laban, Brian (2001)    Le Mans 24 Hours    London: Virgin Books   
 Spurring, Quentin (2015)    Le Mans 1923-29    Yeovil, Somerset: Haynes Publishing

External links
 Racing Sports Cars – Le Mans 24 Hours 1926 entries, results, technical detail. Retrieved 12 Sep 2018
  Le Mans History – entries & results. Retrieved 12 Sep 2018
 World Sports Racing Prototypes – results, reserve entries & chassis numbers. Retrieved 12 Sep 2018
  24h en Piste – results, chassis numbers & hour-by-hour places (in French). Retrieved 12 Sep 2018
  Radio Le Mans – Race article and review by Charles Dressing. Retrieved 5 Dec 2018
  Unique Cars & Parts – results & reserve entries. Retrieved 12 Sep 2018
  Formula 2 – Le Mans results & reserve entries. Retrieved 12 Sep 2018
  Motorsport Memorial – motor-racing deaths by year. Retrieved 12 Sep 2018

24 Hours of Le Mans races
Le Mans
1926 in French motorsport